Kingsize is the sixth album by the Boo Radleys, released in 1998. The band broke up shortly after the album's release.

US versions of the album included the song "Put Your Arms Around Me And Tell Me Everything's Going To Be OK".

Reception

The album was not a commercial success and received mixed reviews. The album charted at number 62 in the UK albums chart; the lead single "Free Huey" reached only number 54. "Kingsize" was scheduled as a second single and was to be released before the end of 1998, promos were even pressed with b-sides, but the band's split derailed the release. A month after the album's release, sales stood at over 10,000 copies.

Track listing

Personnel
Sice - vocals
Rob Cieka - drums, percussion
Tim Brown - bass guitar, keyboards
Martin Carr - guitar, keyboards, vocals

References
Citations

Sources

External links

Kingsize at YouTube (streamed copy where licensed)

1998 albums
The Boo Radleys albums
Creation Records albums